Hue Beer was a lager beer produced and bottled in Huế, Vietnam, by Hue Brewery Ltd. It was first imported to the United States in 1994, just after the lifting of the U.S. embargo on Vietnam. The company was established in 1990 and now is partly owned by Carlsberg. After incorporating into Carlsberg, the company changed its name to Huda Beer.

Hue Brewery Ltd.'s, now Huda Beer's headquarter is located at Nguyen Sinh Cung Street in the city of Huế, Thừa Thiên–Huế Province, on the Perfume River.

See also
 Huda Beer
 List of companies in Vietnam

References

External links
Hue Brewery Ltd. official site
 U.S. Importers Website

Culture in Huế
Vietnamese companies established in 1990
Beer in Vietnam
Vietnamese brands
Food and drink companies established in 1990